Skepasto is a village and a community of the Volvi municipality. Before the 2011 local government reform it was part of the municipality of Arethousa, of which it was a municipal district. The 2011 census recorded 322 inhabitants in the village and 554 in the community. The community of Skepasto covers an area of 30.214 km2.

Administrative division
The community of Skepasto consists of two separate settlements: 
Limni (population 232)
Skepasto (population 322)
The aforementioned population figures are as of 2011.

See also
 List of settlements in the Thessaloniki regional unit

References

Populated places in Thessaloniki (regional unit)